Endotricha is a genus of snout moths. It was described by Philipp Christoph Zeller in 1847.

Species

The flammealis species group
 Endotricha consocia (Butler, 1879)
 Endotricha flammealis (Denis & Schiffermüller, 1775)
 Endotricha ragonoti Christoph, 1893
The theonalis species group
 Endotricha decessalis Walker, 1859
 Endotricha theonalis (Walker, 1859)
The occidentalis species group
 Endotricha occidentalis Hampson, 1916
 Endotricha hemicausta Turner, 1904
 Endotricha melanchroa Turner, 1911
The icelusalis species group
 Endotricha kuznetzovi Whalley, 1963
 Endotricha flavofascialis (Bremer, 1864)
 Endotricha icelusalis (Walker, 1859)
 Endotricha trichophoralis Hampson, 1906
The luteogrisalis species group
 Endotricha affinitalis (Hering, 1901)
 Endotricha consobrinalis Zeller, 1852
 Endotricha ellisoni Whalley, 1963
 Endotricha loricata Moore, 1888
 Endotricha lunulata Wang & Li, 2005
 Endotricha luteogrisalis Hampson, 1896
 Endotricha niveifimbrialis Hampson, 1906
 Endotricha puncticostalis Walker, [1866] 1865
 Endotricha punicea Whalley, 1963
 Endotricha purpurata Wang & Li, 2005
 Endotricha rogenhoferi Rebel, 1892
 Endotricha rosina Ghesquière, 1942
 Endotricha ruminalis (Walker, 1859)
 Endotricha simipunicea Wang & Li, 2005
 Endotricha vinolentalis Ragonot, 1891
 Endotricha wilemani West, 1931
The erythralis species group
 Endotricha altitudinalis (Viette, 1957)
 Endotricha erythralis Mabille, [1900]
 Endotricha tamsi Whalley, 1963
 Endotricha thomealis (Viette, 1957)
 Endotricha viettealis Whalley, 1963
The murecinalis species group
 Endotricha gregalis Pagenstecher, 1900
 Endotricha ignealis Guenée, 1854
 Endotricha murecinalis Hampson, 1916
 Endotricha portialis Walker, 1859
The mesenterialis species group
 Endotricha admirabilis V.A. Kirpichnikova, 2003
 Endotricha argentata Whalley, 1963
 Endotricha mesenterialis (Walker, 1859)
 Endotricha olivacealis (Bremer, 1864)
 Endotricha plinthopa Meyrick, 1886
 Endotricha propinqua Whalley, 1963
 Endotricha sexpunctata Whalley, 1963
 Endotricha valentis V.A. Kirpichnikova, 2003
The costaemaculalis species group
 Endotricha ardentalis Hampson, 1896
 Endotricha costaemaculalis Christoph, 1881
 Endotricha dumalis Wang & Li, 2005
 Endotricha eximia (Whalley, 1963)
 Endotricha fuscobasalis Ragonot, 1891
 Endotricha medogana Wang & Li, 2005
 Endotricha minutiptera H.H. Li, 2009
 Endotricha nigra Wang & Li, 2005
 Endotricha similata (Moore, 1888)
 Endotricha sondaicalis Snellen, 1880
 Endotricha suavalis Snellen, 1895
The nigromaculata species group
 Endotricha borneoensis Hampson, 1916
 Endotricha faceta Whalley, 1963
 Endotricha fastigia Whalley, 1963
 Endotricha hoenei Whalley, 1963
 Endotricha melanobasis Hampson, 1916
 Endotricha metacuralis Hampson, 1916
 Endotricha nigromaculata Whalley, 1963
The rhodomicta species group
 Endotricha aureorufa Whalley, 1963
 Endotricha euphiles Turner, 1932
 Endotricha munroei Whalley, 1963
 Endotricha persicopa Meyrick, 1889
 Endotricha rhodomicta Hampson, 1916
The flavifusalis species group
 Endotricha flavifusalis Warren, 1891
 Endotricha luteobasalis Caradja, 1935
 Endotricha rufofimbrialis Warren, 1891
 Endotricha sandaraca Whalley, 1963
 Endotricha semirubrica Whalley, 1963
The denticostalis species group
 Endotricha albicilia Hampson, 1891
 Endotricha capnospila Meyrick, 1932
 Endotricha chionocosma Turner, 1904
 Endotricha conchylaria Whalley, 1963
 Endotricha cruenta Whalley, 1963
 Endotricha denticostalis Hampson, 1906
 Endotricha fuliginosa Whalley, 1963
The simplex species group
 Endotricha simplex Janse, 1924
 Endotricha variabilis Janse, 1924
The encaustalis species group
 Endotricha approximalis Snellen, 1895
 Endotricha dispergens Lucas, 1891
 Endotricha encaustalis Hampson, 1916
 Endotricha pyrosalis Guenée, 1854
The psammitis species group
 Endotricha nicobaralis Hampson, 1906
 Endotricha psammitis Turner, 1904
The coreacealis species group
 Endotricha coreacealis Pagenstecher, 1884
 Endotricha chionosema Hampson, 1916
 Endotricha dyschroa Turner, 1918
 Endotricha lobibasalis Hampson, 1906
 Endotricha luteopuncta Whalley, 1963
 Endotricha peterella Whalley, 1963
 Endotricha pyrrhaema Hampson, 1916
The pyrrhocosma species group
 Endotricha bradleyi Whalley, 1962
 Endotricha mariana Whalley, 1963
 Endotricha pyrrhocosma Turner, 1911
 Endotricha separata Whalley, 1963
 Endotricha thermidora Hampson, 1916
Unknown species group
 Endotricha convexa Li, 2012
 Endotricha dentiprocessa Li, 2012
 Endotricha parki B.W. Lee & Y.S. Bae, 2007
 Endotricha shafferi Li, 2012
 Endotricha unicolor Li, 2012
 Endotricha wammeralis Pagenstecher, 1886
 Endotricha whalleyi Li, 2012

References

External links

Endotrichini
Pyralidae genera
Taxa named by Philipp Christoph Zeller